USS Gilmore (DE-18) was an Evarts-class short-hull destroyer escort in the service of the United States Navy.

Namesake
Walter William Gilmore was born on 10 February 1895 in Williamsport, Pennsylvania He was commissioned Ensign on 29 June 1917. He was killed on board Lexington in the Battle of the Coral Sea, 7–8 May 1942. Commander Gilmore was posthumously commended by Secretary of the Navy Frank Knox.

Construction and commissioning
Originally allocated to the United Kingdom under terms of the Lend-Lease Program the ship was launched as HMS Halder (BDE-18) on 22 October 1942 by Mare Island Naval Shipyard, California; sponsored by Mrs. Otis J. Boyer, wife of a Quarterman Rigger of the Mare Island Naval Shipyard. She was reallocated back to the United States Navy and renamed USS Gilmore on 19 February 1943, and commissioned on 17 April 1943.

Service history

Northern Pacific, 1943–1944
Gilmore conducted her initial training in San Diego, California. After this initial training period she escorted troopships from San Francisco, California to Pearl Harbor from 28 June to 8 July 1943. Her next mission would be escorting the submarine tender  to Attu Island on 20 September from San Francisco. Sailing as part of the 14 Destroyer Escort Division Pacific, she then served as the escort ship for the United States Coast and Geodetic Survey ship  from 18 to 29 October. For the next three months, Gilmore would serve as an escort between various Alaskan ports, until 20 January 1944. She then participated in air-sea rescue operations off the coast of Attu Island for the 4th Fleet Air Wing until 1 February.

Three days later, Gilmore left Attu for Adak escorting merchant ships, and then escorted  and SS Henry Failing to the Puget Sound Naval Shipyard in Bremerton, Washington, arriving on 16 February 1944. She returned to Dutch Harbor on 1 March and completed nine escort missions between that port and Attu by 20 April 1944.

She departed Dutch Harbor on 23 April to assist  in the escort of merchantmen bound for Kodiak. Near midnight of 25 April her radar picked up a surfaced submarine which dived. Gilmore gained underwater sound contact, made two depth charge attacks, then regained contact at 0010, 26 April. She exploded six depth charges near the submarine and five minutes later six others were dropped directly over the target. A violent underwater explosion caused minor damage in the after motor room of Gilmore as the 1,630-ton Japanese Kaidai-class submarine I-180 settled to the bottom in latitude 50° 10' North; longitude 155°40' West.

Gilmore arrived at Kodiak on 29 April; returned to Dutch Harbor with Army transport Otsego on 9 May, and made five escort voyages between that port and Adak before serving on air-sea rescue station for pilots of Fleet Air Wing Four (1–4 July 1944). Fourteen more escort missions for troop transports were made to Kodiak, Adak, Attu, Kiska and Amchitka by 8 September 1944, followed by plane guard patrol west of Attu for Fleet Air Wing Four until 1 October. She then resumed escort missions between various Alaskan and Aleutian ports.

Western Pacific, 1945
Gilmore departed Dutch Harbor on 13 January 1945 for overhaul in the Mare Island Naval Shipyard until 4 March, then sailed for Hawaii. She entered Pearl Harbor on 10 March, became flagship of Escort Division 14, and departed Pearl Harbor on 20 March as screen commander for a troopship convoy escorted safely to Eniwetok Atoll in the Marshalls on 29 March. After guarding the escort carrier  to Apra Harbor, Guam, she touched at Saipan on 13 April to act as station guide for a task element of tank landing ships that arrived off Iwo Jima on the 18th. After joining  in the escort of two merchantmen to Guam, she departed Saipan on 1 May 1945 with another convoy of amphibious assault ships that arrived off Iwo Jima on the 4th. Assigned to rescue station, she closed within 12 miles of Mount Suribachi that afternoon to rescue an Army aviator from his crashed plane.

She returned to Saipan from this mission on 17 August 1945, made two escort voyages for troop convoys to Okinawa and return by 11 September, proceeded off Marcus Island for patrol (13–28 September), thence to Apra Harbor, Guam.

Gilmore sailed for home on 12 October via Pearl Harbor to San Pedro, California, arriving on 27 October 1945. Gilmore was decommissioned on 29 December 1945 and remained in the San Diego Group, U.S. Pacific Reserve Fleet, until sold for scrapping on 1 February 1947.

Awards

References 
 
 

Evarts-class destroyer escorts
World War II frigates and destroyer escorts of the United States
Ships built in Vallejo, California
1942 ships